Monreale (Sicilian: Murriali) is a town and comune in the Metropolitan City of Palermo, in Sicily, southern Italy. It is located on the slope of Monte Caputo, overlooking the very fertile valley called "La Conca d'oro" (the Golden Shell), a production area of orange, olive and almond trees, the produce of which is exported in large quantities.

Monreale forms its own archdiocese and is home to Monreale Cathedral, a historical Norman-Byzantine cathedral, one of several buildings named in a UNESCO World Heritage Site, a group of nine inscribed as Arab-Norman Palermo and the Cathedral Churches of Cefalù and Monreale.

History

After the occupation of Palermo by the Arabs (the Emirate of Sicily), the Bishop of Palermo was forced to move his seat outside the capital. The role of a cathedral was assigned to a modest little church, Aghia Kiriaki, in a nearby village later known as Monreale. After the Norman conquest in 1072, Christians took back the former Palermo cathedral. Probably the village's role as a temporary ecclesiastical centre played a part in King William II's decision to build a cathedral here.<ref>Rodo Santoro: Palermo Cathedral,' Palermo: 1999, p. 7</ref>

Monreale was a small village for a long time. When the Norman Kings of Sicily chose the area as their hunting resort, more people and commerce came to the area after the royalty built a palace (probably identifiable with the modern town hall).

Under King William II, a large monastery of Benedictines coming from Cava de' Tirreni, with its church, was founded and provided with large assets. The new construction also had an important defensive function. Monreale was the seat of the metropolitan archbishop of Sicily, which from then on exerted a significant influence over Sicily.

In the 19th century, underage marriages, or those performed without the blessing of the bride's parents, were known as "the marriages of Monreale", according to Eliza Lynn Linton. These referred to marriages performed in remote places, where the law was less observed. (see Gretna Green).

Main sights 

 

The Cathedral

The cathedral of Monreale is one of the greatest extant examples of Norman architecture. It was begun in 1174 by William II and completed four years later. In 1182 the church, dedicated to the Nativity of the Virgin Mary, was, by a bull of Pope Lucius III, elevated to the rank of a metropolitan cathedral.

The church is a national monument of Italy and one of the most important attractions of Sicily. Its size is 102 metres long and 40 meters wide. The façade is characterized by two large towers (one partially destroyed by lightning in 1807) and a portal with Romanesque bronze doors decorated by Bonanno Pisano. The interior is on the Latin cross plan, divided by ogival arcades, and features fresco cycles executed during the reigns of William II and Tancred of Sicily (c. 1194). The cloister has 228 small columns, each with different decorations influenced by Provençal, Burgundian, Arab and Salerno medieval art.

Other sightsCastellaccio'' ("Bad Castle"), an example of a fortified convent on the Monte Caputo, at 764 m above sea level. It was built in the 12th century by King William II together with the Cathedral and the annexed monastery. It measures c. 80 x 30 m on an irregular plan with four towers on the western side, a middle tower and an entrance tower on the eastern side.
Abbey church of San Martino delle Scale, founded in the 6th century AD. It is on the  Latin cross plan with a dome, a choir with paintings by Paolo De Matteis (1727), two small side apses, chapels in the transept and ten chapels in each of the aisles. The interior was decorated in 1602 with stuccoes. The baptismal font near the sacristy is from 1396.
Church of Collegiata (16th-19th centuries)
Church of Santa Ciriaca
Church of San Silvestro

International relations

 
Monreale is twinned with:
 Bielsko-Biała, Poland

Notable people
Rocky Segretta (1899–1953), American football player

See also
Arab-Norman Palermo and the Cathedral Churches of Cefalù and Monreale

References

External links

Monreale tourist guide
Adrian Fletcher’s Paradoxplace – Monreale Cathedral and Cloisters

 
Municipalities of the Metropolitan City of Palermo
Norman architecture in Italy
World Heritage Sites in Italy
Arab-Norman Palermo and the Cathedral Churches of Cefalù and Monreale